Macoupin Creek is a  tributary of the Illinois River, which it joins near the village of Hardin, Illinois.

The word macoupin refers to the yellow pond lily (Nuphar advena), a native plant of the regional wetlands, and a favorite food source of local Indians. It has a large rootstock (a tuber) that was baked in a fire pit. The spelling is derived from French attempts at documenting the pronunciation of the Miami-Illinois , with macoupin being the modern form of the earlier French .

Macoupin Creek has been channelized near its junction with the Illinois River. A straight channel cuts through old oxbows on a direct path to the river. The old channel meanders through the Illinois bottoms for about  before joining the river, near the village of Hardin. The two channels thus form an island, called Macoupin Island, across the Illinois River from Hardin.

The old channel of Macoupin Creek forms the northwestern boundary between Greene and Jersey Counties. The actual boundary is ambiguous because of the shifting creek.

The bottom of the valley is mainly flat, and has little or no gradient in the downstream direction. The modern channel runs in a straight line, with little evidence of old oxbows. This portion of Macoupin Creek therefore appears to be a drainage ditch that was dug through a swamp or a marsh, that had no well-defined natural channel. This matches with old accounts that this area was a wetland, with natural lakes, and vast amounts of growing macoupin.

Cities, towns and counties
The following cities, towns and villages are drained by Macoupin Creek:
Carlinville
Farmersville
Girard
Greenfield
Kane
Medora
Palmyra
Royal Lakes
Shipman

Parts of the following counties are in the Macoupin Creek watershed:
Greene County
Jersey County
Montgomery County
Macoupin County

Parks and access points
Beaver Dam State Park

Lakes and impoundments
Bunn Lake
Carlinville Lake
New Gillespie Lake
Otter Lake
Sunset Lake

See also
List of Illinois rivers

References

External links
Beaver Dam State Park History
Department of Natural Resources, Beaver Dam State Park
Illiniwik Food Sources
Prairie Rivers Network
TopoQuest map of Mouth of Macoupin Creek
USGS Stream Gage Macoupin Creek

Rivers of Greene County, Illinois
Rivers of Jersey County, Illinois
Rivers of Macoupin County, Illinois
Rivers of Illinois
Tributaries of the Illinois River